Manuella or Manuela Kalili (2 November 1912 – 14 September 1969) was a Native Hawaiian competition swimmer who represented the United States at the 1932 Summer Olympics in Los Angeles, California. As a member of the second-place U.S. team in the men's 4×200-meter freestyle relay event, he won a silver medal with fellow Americans Frank Booth, George Fissler and Maiola Kalili, who was also his older brother. Individually, he also placed fourth overall in the men's 100-meter freestyle.

See also
 List of Olympic medalists in swimming (men)

References

External links
 
 
 Manuela Kalili - Where Are the Swimmers? - Starbulletin.com
 Manuela Kalili - Hawai'i Sports Hall of Fame

1912 births
1969 deaths
American male freestyle swimmers
Native Hawaiian sportspeople
Olympic silver medalists for the United States in swimming
Swimmers from Honolulu
Swimmers at the 1932 Summer Olympics
Medalists at the 1932 Summer Olympics